B. obtusa may refer to:
 Banksia obtusa, the shining honeypot, a shrub species
 Barleria obtusa, the bush violet, a plant species
 Botryosphaeria obtusa, a plant pathogen species